The University of Sonora (Universidad de Sonora, abbreviated as Unison) is a public university in the northwestern state of Sonora, Mexico that has a strong research program. The university was founded in 1942 and is considered the main cultural and educational driver in the state. The university motto is "El saber de mis hijos hará mi grandeza" ("The knowledge of my children will be my greatness"). It is the largest university of Sonora with about 30,000 students (about 28,000 for undergraduate studies and 2,000 for postgraduate studies) distributed in five campuses.

Dr. Enrique Velázquez Contreras started his tenure as the University Rector in June 2017 for a period of four years (renewable). Under his leadership the university has prepared its Strategic Initiative putting special emphasis on the Internationalization of its academic and research programs.

Overview 
According to the Mexican National Center for Evaluation for Higher Education (CENEVAL), Sonora has recently ranked fifth in the Mexican university ranking survey. It has six post-graduate subjects accredited in the level of academic excellence for the "Mexican Research Council in Science and Technology" (Consejo Nacional de Ciencia y Tecnología de México, CONACYT). It is currently, leader of the National Association of Mexican Higher Education Institutions (ANUIES) in northwestern Mexico.

Academics 
The University of Sonora has research departments and teaching schools in most academic disciplines.
The university provides educational programs in the following colleges:
 Natural Science
 Engineering
 Exact Sciences
 Biological and Health Sciences
 Social Sciences
 Economics and Administration
 Humanities and Fine Arts

Postgraduate programs 
At the postgraduate level, Unison tends to be biased towards scientific subjects, but it also has a number of strong humanities and social science schools. There are 6 subjects accredited in the level of academic excellence for CONACYT.

 Physics, PhD and Masters
 Mathematics, PhD and Masters
 Material Science, PhD and Masters
 Geology, Masters
 Engineering, Masters
 Food Science and Technology, PhD and Masters
 Inmunohematology, Postgraduate certificate
 Integral postgraduate of social sciences, PhD and Masters
 Psychology, PhD and Masters
 Business Administration, Masters

Admission 
Admissions processes at Sonora are based on qualifications relevant to their chosen undergraduate course, admission tests given by the university, and, in some subjects, interviews between applicants and faculty members.

Postgraduate admission is first decided by the department or research center relating to the applicant's subject. In recent years, UNISON has made greater efforts to attract overseas students.

Research institutes 
 Physics Department (DFUS)
 Research Centre of Physics (CIFUS)
 DICTUS Research Centre
 DIPA Research Centre

Campuses 
There are five campuses. Its main campus is located in the capital of the state of Sonora, Hermosillo.
 Hermosillo
 Caborca
 Navojoa
 Nogales
 Santa Ana
 Cajeme
 Huatabampo

Mobility of students 
UNISON intends to increase the access and mobility of its students within the Americas and the European Union area of higher education, contributing to the improvement of their professional skills and their access to better working opportunities in the northwestern region of the country.

Other items of interest 
The university is part of the UN Regional Coordination of Activities in Basic Space Science for America, an aerospace consortium based in Vienna, Austria, and co-sponsored by the European Space Agency.

Starting in the 2011 season, the university will have a team named "Búhos" (Owls) playing in one league of College Football in Mexico, the CONADEIP premier league.

Rectors

Collaborations with other universities 
 Sonora State University ("Universidad Estatal de Sonora")
 Universidad Miguel Hernández

See also 
 XHUS-TDT ("Televisión Universitaria", Unison's television station)

References

External links 
 The University of Sonora website 
 Universidad de Sonora Extension 
 University Radio Station 
 University Television Station 
 Regional Coordination of Activities in Basic Space Science for America

Universidad de Sonora
Educational institutions established in 1942
Hermosillo
1942 establishments in Mexico